Voicemeeter is a virtual mixing console and sound card running on the Windows operating system. It allows the processing of any audio signal – whether its source is physical (microphone) or virtual (application) – and its transmission to physical audio devices and/or applications.

Voicemeeter offers many useful features for audio activities: VoIP users, video gamers, users of audio software such as VLC media player, Audacity, etc.

Three versions of the software are available: Voicemeeter (or "Voicemeeter Standard") which offers two physical and one virtual inputs/outputs, Voicemeeter Pro (called "Banana") with three physical and two virtual inputs/outputs, an integrated recorder and additional audio processing, and Voicemeeter "Potato" offering five physical and three virtual inputs/outputs.

Distributed according to the donationware model, the application can be downloaded for free.

Features

Virtual mixing console 
As a virtual mixing console, Voicemeeter makes it possible to interconnect and mix audio streams from many audio devices and applications thanks to the concept of physical inputs/outputs (for audio devices) and virtual inputs/outputs (for applications): USB microphone, DVD players, video games, iTunes, VoIP applications, Digital Audio Workstation (DAW), etc.

Aggregation of audio devices and applications 
Voicemeeter makes it possible to mix multiple audio sources from different devices, such as a USB microphone or line input, with the sound of PC applications, such as a video player.
Voicemeeter Standard offers two physical inputs and one virtual input.
Voicemeeter Banana offers three physical inputs and two virtual ones.
Voicemeeter Potato offers five physical inputs and three virtual ones.

Mixing and real-time processing 

Just like a physical mixing console, Voicemeeter allows you to mix and process the different signals in real time with, in particular, equalizers, compressors and noise gates ("Audibility" button for Voicemeeter Standard), and gain controls materialized by vertical sliders.
For the physical inputs, the Intellipan offers equalizers presented in the form of a two-dimensional panel allowing the rapid and almost instinctive correction of the intelligibility of the voice. In addition, Voicemeeter Banana has an advanced independent equalizer on each of the bus outputs.

Multiple outputs 
The generated audio signals can then be sent separately to several physical (speakers, television, Bluetooth ...) or virtual (Skype, Audacity, OBS, Twitch...) playback devices.
Voicemeeter Standard has one physical output and one virtual output.
Voicemeeter Banana has three physical outputs and two virtual outputs.
Voicemeeter Potato has five physical outputs and three virtual outputs.

Voicemeeter thus makes it easy, for example, to change your voice, add music and send all in a conversation via Skype or play 5.1 video games while conversing with your team.

Built-in recording 
Voicemeeter Banana integrates an audio recorder, in the form of a cassette tape recorder from the 1980s, which allows recording bus inputs or outputs in WAV, AIFF, BWF and MP3 format. It is also an audio player supporting audio files in WAV, AIFF, MP3, M4A, MP4, MOV, AVI, WMA, WMV format,.

Universal Audio Interface 
Voicemeeter can use Windows audio devices with WASAPI (WDM), Kernel streaming or Multimedia Extensions interfaces and it can also manage an ASIO audio device (on output A1). It has one to three virtual inputs/outputs with all interfaces: WASAPI, KS, MME, WaveRT, DirectX as well as ASIO (to connect professional audio software to Voicemeeter). Voicemeeter Banana also offers a virtual ASIO insert driver to connect a VST host application (DAW) and process the various Voicemeeter inputs with software plug-in or any professional audio applications.

Built-in audio device drivers 
Voicemeeter also comes with recording and playback audio drivers (giving the virtual inputs / outputs). Once these have been configured as default devices, they allow you to perform all previously mentioned tasks while avoiding conflicts between audio devices.

Audio network 
The VBAN protocol makes it possible to send / receive uncompressed audio streams over a local area network and thus to interconnect computers without having to use audio cables.

MIDI control 
The control of the main parameters by a MIDI control surface allows managing all the sound of the computer with a dedicated controller (Korg NanoKontrol for example).

Programmable control and remote control 
Voicemeeter is installed with MacroButton, which allows you to create complex functions to act on one or more of the settings of Voicemeeter with a keyboard key (keyboard shortcut), a MIDI code, a threshold on an incoming signal (trigger) or an Xbox controller button (XInput). It is thus possible to change the Voicemeeter configuration with a single click and instantly adapt it to the different uses that one makes of it.

VoicemeeterRemote API 
Voicemeeter can be considered as a system audio component that can be used by any application. An API called VoicemeeterRemote API allows read and write actions on Voicemeeter parameters and thus control Voicemeeter from a program to use it as an audio service or as a virtual sound card. A program can thus set up signal processing callbacks to process the sound in Voicemeeter. Any programming language can be used.

Documentation 
Voicemeeter has a dedicated forum and a Discord server, managed by the development team and expert users.

A detailed and regularly updated manual is also available for download on the publisher's website. In addition to the software's features, it presents the basic configuration to be carried out, proposes practical case studies and provides solutions to the most common problems.

Video tutorials are also regularly posted on the Internet by Voicemeeter users.

Distribution model 
Voicemeeter is distributed under the donationware model. The application can therefore be downloaded and used free of charge, without any limitation of functionalities. The user is then invited to make a donation to the developer, by selecting the amount of his contribution.

See also 
 Mixing console
 Audio mixing
 Signal processing

References

External links 
 
 Editor's website

Signal processing
Digital audio
Audio interfaces
Audio network protocols
Digital audio recording
Audio recording software
Audio software
Audio mixing software
Voice over IP
Sound production technology
Audio mixing
Mixing consoles
Windows multimedia software